The 1982 CCHA Men's Ice Hockey Tournament was the 11th CCHA Men's Ice Hockey Tournament. It was played between March 5 and March 13, 1982. First round games were played at campus sites, while 'final four' games were played at Joe Louis Arena in Detroit, Michigan for the first time. By winning the tournament, Michigan State received the Central Collegiate Hockey Association's automatic bid to the 1982 NCAA Division I Men's Ice Hockey Tournament.

Format
The tournament featured three rounds of play. The four teams that finished below eighth place in the standings were not eligible for postseason play. In the quarterfinals, the first and eighth seeds, the second and seventh seeds, the third seed and sixth seeds and the fourth seed and fifth seeds played a two-game series where the team that scored the higher number of goals after the games was declared the victor and advanced to the semifinals. In the semifinals, the remaining highest and lowest seeds and second highest and second lowest seeds play a single-game, with the winners advancing to the finals. The tournament champion receives an automatic bid to the 1982 NCAA Division I Men's Ice Hockey Tournament.

Conference standings
Note: GP = Games played; W = Wins; L = Losses; T = Ties; PTS = Points; GF = Goals For; GA = Goals Against

Bracket

Note: * denotes overtime period(s)

First round

(1) Bowling Green vs. (8) Northern Michigan

(2) Michigan State vs. (7) Lake Superior State

(3) Michigan Tech vs. (6) Ferris State

(4) Notre Dame vs. (5) Michigan

Semifinals

(1) Bowling Green vs. (4) Notre Dame

(2) Michigan State vs. (3) Michigan Tech

Consolation Game

(1) Bowling Green vs. (3) Michigan Tech

Championship

(2) Michigan State vs. (4) Notre Dame

Tournament awards

MVP
Ron Scott (Michigan State)

References

External links
CCHA Champions
1981–82 CCHA Standings
1981–82 NCAA Standings

CCHA Men's Ice Hockey Tournament
Ccha tournament